The 2009–10 University of Akron Zips basketball team represented the University of Akron in the college basketball season of 2009–10. The Zips, led by head coach Keith Dambrot, are members of the Mid-American Conference and played their home games at James A. Rhodes Arena. They finished the season 24–11, 12–4 in MAC play, lost in the championship game of the 2010 MAC men's basketball tournament and were invited to the 2010 College Basketball Invitational where they lost in the first round.

Before the season

Coaching changes
Assistant Coach Jeff Boals left the team to be a coach for the Ohio State Buckeyes men's basketball team under head coach Thad Matta.  The Zips made sure that head coach Keith Dambrot stayed.  Before the season began, The University voted for a two-year contract extension with Dambrot, that would keep him in Akron through the 2015–16 season.  This comes after Dambrot's fifth season which the team.  Within those five season, he has recorded a 115–51 (0.692) record, including a 64–8 (0.889) record at home.

Roster changes
Not much will change from last season's team.  The Zips only lost one senior starter, 2009 MAC Tournament MVP Nate Linhart, to graduation and professional play in Austria.  Along with Lenhart, letterman Eric Coblentz left the Zips to join NAIA team Malone University Pioneers.  The team will meet up with Coblentz again, as the Zips have a match scheduled with them on September 12.  To replace Linhart, the Zips recruited ESPN Top 100 recruit Zeke Marshall from McKeesport Area High School in Pennsylvania.

Recruiting

Roster

Coaching staff

Schedule

|-
!colspan=9| Exhibition

|-
!colspan=9| Regular Season

|-
!colspan=9| 2010 MAC men's basketball tournament

|-
!colspan=9| 2010 College Basketball Invitational

|- style="background:#f9f9f9;"
| colspan=9 | *Non-Conference Game.  #Rankings from AP Poll.  All times are in Eastern Time Zone.
|}

References

Akron Zips men's basketball seasons
Akron Zips
Akron